Orleans House was a Palladian villa built by the architect John James in 1710 near the Thames at Twickenham, England, for the politician and diplomat James Johnston. It was subsequently named after the Duc d'Orléans who stayed there in the early 19th century. By the early 20th century it was derelict and in 1926 it was mostly demolished. However, parts of the property, including a baroque octagonal room designed by architect James Gibbs, were preserved. The octagon room and its service wing are listed Grade I by Historic England and, together, with a converted stable block,  are now the Orleans House Gallery, a gallery of art relating to the London Borough of Richmond upon Thames and neighbouring areas of London.

History

18th century

James Johnston settled at Twickenham at the end of his political career. Johnston had seen diplomatic service in Germany, first as King's envoy to Berlin and later working to secure the Hanoverian succession, and made frequent journeys to Hanover. It was said George I "often conversed with him very familiarly" and that Johnston was "a great favourite of Queen Caroline, who was much entertained with his humour and pleasantry". It was also said "he keeps out a very great rank, and frequently has Mr. Walpool and the greatest courtiers with him at his country house near London; and the King sometimes does him the honour to dine with him". The King (George I) is also recorded to have been a regular casual visitor to the house.

Johnston was one of the first to construct a home on the Thames in Twickenham during the 18th century. He procured a lease (from the then under-lessee Mrs Davies) and commissioned architect John James to plan and erect a mansion – a project which spanned the following 35 years. The grounds were extensive, including the area now known as the Orleans House woodlands. Johnston created a fine garden which "included canals, an icehouse, a kitchen garden, a pleasure garden, a wilderness, a grotto and a fruit garden".
A baroque octagonal room, designed by architect James Gibbs, was added in 1720 for entertaining George II's Queen Consort, Caroline, who regarded Johnston with great favour.

19th century
Louis-Phillippe, Duc d'Orléans, while in exile, lived in Johnston's house at Twickenham between 1813 and 1815 and the house was later named after him.

20th century

Orleans House was demolished in 1926, and the area formerly occupied by the house used to quarry gravel throughout the 1930s. The outbuildings and octagon room were saved by the efforts of a local figure, the Hon. Nellie Levy, later Nellie Ionides, who left it and her collection of 18th- and 19th-century pictures to the borough. It became a listed building in 1952 and was converted into an art gallery in 1972.

In 1973,  at the northern end of the former park were taken as the site of Orleans Park School.

21st century
The buildings and site were refurbished between 2005 and 2008 by architects Patel Taylor to incorporate an education centre and a cafe.

Orleans House Gallery

Orleans House Gallery, which opened in 1972, displays material from the London Borough of Richmond upon Thames' art collection. This includes a portrait of James Johnston by Thomas Gibson, paintings of Orleans House by Arthur Vickers and several other artists, and the Burton Collection, which includes artwork, personal effects and photographs of the explorer Richard Francis Burton.

Orleans House Gallery is also the site of the London Borough of Richmond upon Thames' arts service and provides educational workshops for a wide variety of ages, using the converted stables and coach house as educational spaces. The gallery can also be hired as a wedding venue and for functions.

The gallery reopened in March 2018 after a 17-month restoration project costing £3.7 million, which was partly funded by the Heritage Lottery Fund through a £1.8m grant. The Octagon Room has been restored, facilities improved and the upper floor extended to provide additional space. The painting of Queen Caroline has been relocated outside the Octagon Room.

Exhibitions
The gallery's previous exhibitions have  included watercolours and sketches by Richard Dadd and, in 2003, the first major retrospective of Stephen Wiltshire's works. The gallery's exhibition Capability Now (from February to June 2016) marked the 300th anniversary of the birth of Capability Brown.

Gallery

See also
Museum of Richmond
Twickenham Museum

Note

References

Bibliography
 Patricia Astley Cooper, The History of Orleans House, Twickenham, Twickenham 1984
Miranda Stearn and Mark De Novellis, Orleans House – a history, Twickenham 2002: free download
Orleans House and The Octagon, Local History Notes, Richmond Libraries’ Local Studies Collection, London Borough of Richmond upon Thames

External links
 Official website: Orleans House Gallery
 Twickenham Museum: Orleans House
 Richmond upon Thames Borough Art Collection on Art UK

1710 establishments in England
Houses completed in 1710
Art museums and galleries in London
Art museums established in 1972
Buildings and structures on the River Thames
Country houses in London
Grade I listed buildings in the London Borough of Richmond upon Thames
Grade I listed houses in London
History of the London Borough of Richmond upon Thames
History of Middlesex
James Gibbs buildings
Middlesex
Museums in the London Borough of Richmond upon Thames
Museums on the River Thames
Palladian architecture in England
Twickenham
Louis Philippe I